"Let's Go Brandon" is a protest song released as a single by American rapper Loza Alexander. It criticizes Joe Biden, president of the United States, and the mainstream media. Its title, which is repeated in the chorus, is based on "Let's Go Brandon", a political slogan and meme that became popular as a minced oath for "Fuck Joe Biden". It debuted at number 45 on the US Billboard Hot 100 chart for the week ending October 30, 2021. It has since entered the top 40 of the Hot 100 chart, peaking at number 38.

In the music video, Alexander is seen wearing a red "Make Music Great Again" hat in reference to the "Make America Great Again" campaign slogan Donald Trump used in his 2016 and 2020 presidential campaigns. The song heavily samples the spoken dialogue "Let's go, Brandon" by reporter Kelli Stavast as well as the "Fuck Joe Biden" chants, taken from a televised interview of driver Brandon Brown at the NASCAR Xfinity Series race Sparks 300 on October 2, 2021.

Charts

See also
 FDT (song)

References

External links

2021 songs
2021 singles
American hip hop songs
Cultural depictions of Joe Biden
Protest songs
Conservative media in the United States
Songs about presidents of the United States